A dun is an ancient or medieval fort.

Dun or DUN may also refer to:

Places
Dun, Angus, a civil parish in Scotland
Dun, Ariège, a commune in southern France
Dun, Iran, a village in Hormozgan Province, Iran
 Dun, Norway, a village in Trøndelag, Norway
Dùn, an island of St Kilda, Scotland
Dün, a range of hills in Thuringia, Germany
Dun or Doon Valley in the Sivalik hills of northern India
 Dun Bhruichlinn, an Iron Age fort south of Esknish, Islay, Scotland.
 Dun Borrafiach, an Iron Age broch on the island of Skye, Scotland
 Dun Glacier
 Dun Guaidhre, an Iron Age fort southwest of Kilmeny, Islay, Scotland
 Dun Nosebridge, an Iron Age fort southeast of Bridgend, Islay, Scotland
 Dun Ringill, an Iron Age hill fort on the Strathaird peninsula on the island of Skye, Scotland
 Dun Sar, a village in Gatab-e Shomali Rural District, Gatab District, Babol County, Mazandaran Province, Iran
Dun-le-Poëlier, a commune in central France
House of Dun, a Scottish estate

People with the name or title

Given name or title
Consort Dun (1746–1806), Chinese imperial consort
Dun Deal (born 1986), American record producer and rapper
Dun Mihaka
Dun Karm Psaila (1871–1961), Maltese writer and poet
Dun Mikiel Xerri (1737–1799)

Surname 
Angus Dun (1892–1971), American clergyman and author
Dennis Dun (born 1952), Chinese–American actor
Edwin Dun (1848–1931), American agriculturalist
Jean Dun (died 1735), French opera singer
Josh Dun (born 1988), American musician and drummer of Twenty One Pilots
Tan Dun (born 1957), Chinese composer
William Sutherland Dun (1868–1934), Australian palaeontologist and geologist

Biology
Dun gene, which produces a brownish-gray color (dun) in horses and other Equidae
Subimago, or dun, a stage in the life cycle of mayflies, especially an artificial fishing fly tied to imitate one

Computing and technology
Dial-up networking (DUN,) a dialed connection to the Internet via public telephone lines
Dial-up Networking Profile, a Bluetooth computer communications profile

Other uses
Data Universal Numbering System (DUNS), a unique numeric identifier for businesses
Dewan Undangan Negeri (DUN), the legislative assemblies of Malaysian states
Dün (band), a French progressive rock band active 1978-1981
Dun & Bradstreet, an American credit reporting agency
Dun comma or enumeration comma, a Chinese punctuation mark
Dun Cow, a brown bovine; a common motif in English folklore

See also
Dunn (disambiguation)
River Dun (disambiguation)
Duns (disambiguation)
Dunning (disambiguation)